László "Leslie" Mándoki (born 7 January 1953) is a German-Hungarian musician who became known as a member of the music group Dschinghis Khan. He continued his career as a solo artist and became a music producer who worked with many internationally famous artists.

Early life 
Mándoki studied drums and percussion at the musical conservatory of Budapest in the early 1970s. At the same time he was a band leader for the local jazz-rock group JAM, citing groups like Cream and Jethro Tull as his influence.

In July 1975, Mándoki, along with animation filmmaker Gábor Csupó (the creator of Rugrats) and others, fled from Hungary to Munich, West Germany to avoid prosecution by the communist regime for being a member of the student opposition. He had been imprisoned 17 times for his political opposition before he fled into the West.

Dschingis Khan 
Dschinghis Khan, where Mandoki was one of the six members, was the German entry for the Eurovision Song Contest 1979, finishing on 4th place. Mandoki performed on 15 episodes of the music show "ZDF Hitparade" with Dschinghis Khan between 1979 and 1982. Mandoki stated in later interviews that he was glad about his time with Dschingis Khan, although he felt unsure at the time about being in the group as he felt more at home with rock music. He has not taken part in the reunion of Dschingis Khan since 2015.

Producer 
Mandoki is today a well-known producer who has rented the Park Studios near Lake Starnberg. He has worked as a producer for many German and international acts, including No Angels, Phil Collins, Engelbert, Joshua Kadison, Lionel Richie and Jennifer Rush. He also worked as a musical director for commercials, with clients including Audi, Daimler and Disney.

ManDoki Soulmates 

In 1993, Mandoki founded a group called ManDoki Soulmates, which combines elements of progressive rock with jazz music. The group has produced more than a dozen albums since then. Many notable artists appeared as guest musicians on the Soulmates albums, including Ian Anderson, Robin Gibb, Jack Bruce, Steve Lukather, Bobby Kimball, Midge Ure, Nik Kershaw, Al Di Meola, Michael and Randy Brecker, Till Brönner and Eric Burdon.

In April and November 2004, Mandoki and the Soulmates appeared together with many acclaimed international artists in the two-part television show 50 Jahre Rock ("50 Years of Rock") on ZDF hosted by Thomas Gottschalk. Material from these shows was later used for the album Legends of Rock.

Trivia 
In 2003, he played a guest role on three episodes of the German teenager television series Schloss Einstein.

In 2020, he joined the group "Alcatéia", in Arton, where he became known under the name of Boris Blyatnov.

Discography 

 Back to Myself (Jupiter, 1982)
 Children of Hope (Gong, 1986)
 Strangers in a Paradise (Titan, 1988)
 Drums and Percussion (Selected Sound, 1991)
 Out of Key...with the Time (Electrola, 1992)
 People in Room No. 8 (PolyGram, 1997)
 Soulmates (Paroli, 2002)
 Soulmates Classic (Sony, 2003)
 Legends of Rock (Paroli, 2005)
 Aquarelle (NEO, 2009)
 BudaBest (Sony, 2013)

Awards
 Order of Merit of the Republic of Hungary (2012)

References

External links
 Official Website
 Legends of Rock
 Biography
 Interview by Tigran Arakelyan
 

Hungarian defectors
1953 births
Living people
Musicians from Budapest
Hungarian pop singers
Dschinghis Khan members
20th-century Hungarian male singers
21st-century German male singers